Cornwell is an unincorporated community in Prince William County, Virginia, United States.  It is located on State Route 234 (Dumfries Road) about one mile north of Canova at its intersection with Purcell Road. Though Cornwell is a named location on Mapquest, as of 2006 there is no signage at the location to indicate that the area is identified as such. This place name may no longer be in common local use. Cornwell has also been known as Big Oak.

Unincorporated communities in Prince William County, Virginia